Love's Lines, Angles and Rhymes is the sixth album by American pop group The 5th Dimension, released in 1971. The title song had been recorded originally by Diana Ross the previous year.  It reached #17 on Billboard's Top 200 Album Chart and became the band's third consecutive album to be certified Gold.

Following the success of "One Less Bell to Answer" featuring Marilyn McCoo as lead vocalist, she was once again chosen to take the reins for the first single from the album.  The record, after which the album was named, became another Top 20 hit for The 5th.  The follow-up single, "Light Sings", fared less well, just missing the Top 40.  No other singles were issued from this album, as Bell Records decided to prepare for the group's first 'live' album release instead.

Track listing

Side One
"Time and Love" (Laura Nyro)
"Love's Lines, Angles and Rhymes" (Dorothea Joyce)
"What Does It Take" (Harvey Fuqua, Johnny Bristol, Vernon Bullock)
"Guess Who" (Jesse Belvin, JoAnne Belvin)
"Viva Tirado" (Gerald Wilson, Norman Gimbel)

Side Two
"Light Sings" (Gary William Friedman, Will Holt)
"The Rainmaker" (Bill Martin, Harry Nilsson)
"He's a Runner" (Laura Nyro)
"The Singer" (Elliott Willensky, Lamonte McLemore)
"Every Night" (Paul McCartney)

Of note:
The track "He's a Runner" was originally slated to appear on The Age of Aquarius, and is listed on the covers of early issues of the album.

Personnel

The 5th Dimension
Marilyn McCoo - lead vocals (tracks 1–2), background vocals
Florence LaRue - lead vocals (tracks 1, 8), background vocals 
Billy Davis Jr. - lead vocals (tracks 6–7, 9–10), background vocals 
Lamonte McLemore - background vocals
Ron Townson - background vocals

Instrumentalists
Hal Blaine - drums
Joe Osborn, Max Bennett - bass
Larry Knechtel, Gary Illingworth - keyboards
Dennis Budimir, Fred Tackett, Mike Deasy, Mike Anthony - guitars
Jimmy Rowles - piano
Catherine Gothoffer - harp
Jack Arnold, Larry Bunker, Victor Feldman - percussion
Jim Horn, Tom Scott, Pete Christlieb, Lanny Morgan - saxophones
Lew McCreary, Bob Edmondson - trombones
Bud Brisbois, Chuck Findley, Oliver Mitchell, Ray Triscari - trumpets
The Sid Sharp String Section - strings

Singles 
Billboard (North America)

1971 albums
The 5th Dimension albums
Albums produced by Bones Howe
Bell Records albums
Albums recorded at Wally Heider Studios